Sakuya may refer to:


People
 Shunsuke Sakuya (咲野 俊介, born 1965), Japanese actor and voice actor

Fictional characters
 Sakuya Aizawa, a character in the manga series Hayate the Combat Butler
 Sakuya Ayuzawa, a character in the manga series Maid Sama!
 Sakuya Fujitaka, a character in the anime television series Symphogear
 Sakuya Hishigata, a character in the tokusatsu television series Kamen Rider Decade
 Sakuya Izayoi, a character in the video game series Touhou Project
 Sakuya Kira, a character in the manga series Angel Sanctuary
 Sakuya Kumashiro, a character in the anime television series Tenchi in Tokyo
 Sakuya Shiomi, a character in the video game Persona 3
 Sakuya Shirayuri, a character in the video game Aikatsu Friends!
 Sakuya Tachibana, a character in the tokusatsu television series Kamen Rider Blade
 Sakuya Togane, a character in the anime television series Psycho-Pass
 Sakuya Yamaki, a character in the manga series 7 Seeds
 Sakuya, a character in the manga series Samurai Deeper Kyo
 Sakuya, a character in the visual novel Utawarerumono
 Sakuya, a character in the anime series Eureka Seven
 Sakuya, a character in the light novel series Sword Art Online
 Sakuya, a character in the original video animation series Genesis Survivor Gaiarth
 Sakuya, a character in the light novel series Sister Princess
 Sakuya, a character in the manga series Indian Summer
 Sakuya, a character in the video game Kuon
 Sakuya, a character in the video game Tales of Innocence
 Sakuya, a character in the manga series Monster Hunter Orage
 Sakuya, a character in the anime television series Legends of the Dark King
 Sakuya, a character in the original video animation series .hack//Quantum
 Sakuya, a character in the video game Shining Blade
 Sakuya Fujimiya, a character in the visual novel A Good Librarian Like a Good Shepherd
 Sakuya Haibara, a character in the video game Fatal Frame: Mask of the Lunar Eclipse
 Sakuya Hikawa, a character in the tokusatsu television series Kaitou Sentai Lupinranger VS Keisatsu Sentai Patranger
 Sakuya Kamiyama, a character in the original video animation Candy Boy
 Sakuya Kamon, a character in the anime television series Dancouga Nova – Super God Beast Armor
 Sakuya Kawahara, a character in the visual novel I/O
 Sakuya Kurai, a character in the manga series Ms. Vampire Who Lives in My Neighborhood
 Sakuya Le Bel Shirogane, a character in the video game Hatoful Boyfriend
 Sakuya Nijō, a character in the video game Norn9
 Sakuya Ohtor, a character in the visual novel Rewrite
 Sakuya Ookochi, a character in the manga series Sensual Phrase
 Sakuya Sakuma, a character in the video game A3!
 Sakuya Shiina, a character in the manga series Twinkle Stars
 Sakuya Shimazu, a character in the manga series Isuca
 Sakuya Tachibana, a character in the video game God Eater
 Sakuya Takagi, a character in the manga series Baby Steps
 Sakuya Tsukumo, a character in the light novel series Absolute Duo
 Sakuya Sazanami, a character in the anime television series Star-Myu
 Sakuya Watanuki, a character in the manga series Servamp
 Kagami Sakuya, a character in the visual novel FairChild

Other uses
 Konohanasakuya-hime, a goddess in Japanese mythology
 Sakuya Konohana Kan, a botanical garden in Tsurumi-ku, Osaka, Japan

See also
 Sakura (disambiguation)

Japanese-language surnames